The Door with Seven Locks is a 1940 British horror film, created and released shortly after the British Board of Film Censors lifted its mid-1930s ban on supernatural-themed and horror genre films. It was based on the 1926 novel The Door with Seven Locks by Edgar Wallace. Released in the United States by Monogram Pictures under the title Chamber of Horrors, it was the second Wallace film adaptation to arrive in the United States, the first being The Dark Eyes of London (called The Human Monster in the US), starring Béla Lugosi, which had been released the year before.

Plot
A wealthy lord dies and is entombed with a valuable deposit of jewels. Seven keys are required to unlock the tomb and get hold of the treasure. A series of mysterious events causes the keys to be scattered, and when trying to unravel the circumstances, the heiress of the fortune and her companion investigators become entangled in a web of fraud, deceit, torture, and murder.

It becomes obvious that family physician, Dr. Manetta, is the untrustworthy person. Assi sted by the mute family
butler and the family chauffeur (a forger on  the run), Manetta seeks to steal the treasure for himself. When rightful heiress June Lansdowne arrives, she is seized and locked in the tomb before she can announce her presence. She is eventually freed by a pet monkey that steals the key to the tomb.

Suspicion grows when Dr.Manetta announces he is an admirer of Torquemada (the chief torturer during the Spanish Inquisition); and that he keeps a museum of torture instruments in the basement.

When the authorities close in, Manetta is trapped in an automatic spiked mummy case. The police reluctantly rescue him. Manetta makes a full confession, then commits suicide by poison. He is proud that he killed himself with a goblet once owned by Lucretia Borgia.

The treasure is discovered inside the tomb, the one place Manetta didn't search because he didn't want to call attention to Lansdowne's captivity there.

Cast
Leslie Banks as Dr. Manetta
Lilli Palmer as June Lansdowne
Romilly Lunge as Dick Martin
Gina Malo as Glenda Baker
David Horne as Edward Havelock
Richard Bird as Inspector Sneed
Cathleen Nesbitt as Ann Cody
JH Roberts as Luis Silva
Aubrey Mallalieu as Lord Charles Francis Selford
Harry Hutchinson as Bevan Cody
Ross Landon as John Selford
Phil Ray as Tom Cawler
Robert Montgomery as Craig the Butler

See also
 The Door with Seven Locks (1962)

References

External links

  
  

British horror films
1940 films
1940 horror films
British black-and-white films
1940s English-language films
Films based on works by Edgar Wallace
1940s British films